Rock Hard is the seventh solo studio album by the American rock singer-songwriter and bass guitarist Suzi Quatro. It was originally released in October 1980, and was her first and only release by the record label, Dreamland. The album was recorded over a period of one month in 1980, at United Western Studios, in Hollywood. It features three prolific guest backing vocalists, including Paul Delph, Michael Des Barres, and Andrea Robinson. It is notably her last album to chart anywhere for twenty-six years, until she released Back to the Drive, in 2006. The album featured the songs "Rock Hard", "Glad All Over", and "Lipstick" which were all released as singles. The aforementioned title track was a commercial success, peaking at Number 9 in Australia, but only peaked at #68 in the UK, while "Lipstick" was only a moderate success peaking at #46 in Australia, and at #51 in US. "Glad All Over", a cover version of a song originally by The Dave Clark Five, unlike the other singles was the only one to chart in Belgium, peaking at #25.
 
On release, the album was received favorably by the majority of music critics, with many critics claiming it to be her best album of the 1980s. However, it was still Quatro's poorest selling studio album up to that point in the US and Norway, although in Australia Suzi was given a gold record for both the album and single by music entrepreneur Ian 'Molly' Meldrum in 1981.

The album was re-released in 2012, and was the first of several remastered reissues by Cherry Red Records on Compact Disc. Cherry Red have since released other Quatro remasters, as well as releasing her latest studio album, In the Spotlight.

Critical reception
In a retrospective review for AllMusic, critic Donald A. Guarisco wrote of the album "Although it lacks the kind of single that would have put it over the top commercially, Rock Hard is so consistent and likable that it is tough to argue with. In short, Rock Hard is a necessity and a solid listen for anyone interested in what female-oriented rock was like before the advent of grrl rockers like L7 and Hole."

Track listing

Charts

Personnel
 Suzi Quatro - lead vocals, bass guitar, organ
 Len Tuckey - lead guitar, backing vocals
 Jamie Crompton - guitar
 Dave Neal - drums
 Andrea Robinson - backing vocals
 Linda Lawley - backing vocals
 Michael Des Barres - backing vocals
 Paul Delph - backing vocals
 Sue Richman - backing vocals
 Mike Chapman - producer

References

External links

1980 albums
Suzi Quatro albums
Cherry Red Records albums
Pop rock albums by American artists
Albums produced by Mike Chapman
Albums recorded at United Western Recorders